Francesco Racanelli (1904–1978) was an Italian doctor, pranotherapist and writer, and the originator of an unconventional therapy that he called in  or "bio-radiant medicine".

Biography 

Francesco Racanelli was born in 1904 in Sannicandro di Bari, Puglia, Italy. He believed that he possessed a gift which, much later in his life, he called "bio-radiant energy", and that there was a "vital fluid" which "emanated" from "particularly gifted people". He began to practice on people. As a result, he was prosecuted for the illegal practice of medicine. To avoid further legal problems, he studied medicine and qualified as a doctor. He worked as a healer and lecturer in Florence. He treated wounded people in Florence during the Liberation of Italy.

Francesco Racanelli died in Orbetello, in 1978.

Bibliography 

Francesco Racanelli wrote several books, some of which were translated into French and German. They include:

 
 
  French translation 1951.
  German translation 1951.
  Nine stories, 1945–1975.

References 

1904 births
1978 deaths
People from Sannicandro di Bari